Leslie "Les" L. White (birth unknown – death unknown) was a Welsh professional rugby league footballer who played in the 1920s, 1930s and 1940s. Les White was also a lance corporal in the British Army during World War II.

Playing career

International honours
White won seven caps for Wales from 1928 to 1933 while at Pontypridd and Hunslet, won a cap for England while at Hunslet in 1933 against Australia, and won caps for Great Britain while at Hunslet in 1932 Australia (3 matches), and New Zealand (2 matches), and in 1933 Australia (2 matches).

Wales and England
Only four rugby league footballers have played initially for Wales, and then subsequently for England, they are; Emlyn Jenkins, Gus Risman, Jim Sullivan and Les White.

By the time White played for England, and Yorkshire, he would have moved from the Pontypridd area, and was living in Yorkshire, as he was playing for Hunslet at the time.

Championship final appearances
Leslie White played  in Hunslet's 8-2 victory over Leeds in the Championship Final during the 1937–38 season at Elland Road, Leeds on Saturday 30 April 1938.

Other notable matches
Leslie White played  for Northern Command XIII against a Rugby League XIII at Thrum Hall, Halifax on Saturday 21 March 1942. Coincidentally, he played alongside another Les White.

Outside of rugby league
Les White was the landlord of the St. Helens Inn public house, Whitehouse Street, Hunslet, Leeds during the 1930s, and the Moorhouse Inn public house, Moor Crescent, Hunslet, Leeds during the 1950s.

References

External links

British Army personnel of World War II 
England national rugby league team players
Great Britain national rugby league team players
Hunslet F.C. (1883) players
Northern Command XIII rugby league team players
Place of birth missing
Place of death missing
Publicans
Rugby league hookers
Wales national rugby league team players
Welsh rugby league players
Year of birth missing
Year of death missing
Yorkshire rugby league team players